Superstar K is a South Korean television talent show series which is held yearly. First held in 2009, Superstar K has increasingly gained more attention, considered the biggest audition program in South Korea. Superstar K's concept involves that of finding the next "superstar," with the winner each week determined with a combination of the scores given by judges and votes from viewers.

The show received immense popularity for its first three seasons, discovering popular acts such as Seo In-guk, Huh Gak, John Park, Kang Seungyoon, Ulala Session and Busker Busker, and reached its peak in ratings in its fourth season with Roy Kim and Jung Joon-young as its forefront. The show saw a decline in popularity and ratings starting from its fifth season. The eighth season of Superstar K broke with tradition and abandoned the series number in its name, and was instead called Superstar K 2016.

Traditionally, the award winner of each season is given the chance to perform at the Mnet Asian Music Awards as well as receive other prizes.

Seasons 
 Superstar K1
 Superstar K2
 Superstar K3
 Superstar K4
 Superstar K5
 Superstar K6
 Superstar K7
 Superstar K 2016

Winning contestants

References

External links

 Official website

 
2009 South Korean television series debuts
2010s South Korean television series
Korean-language television shows
South Korean reality television series